The 2005 Dutch Open, also known by its sponsored name The Priority Telecom Open, was an ATP men's tennis tournament staged in Amersfoort, Netherlands and part of the International Series of the 2005 ATP Tour. It was the 46th edition of the tournament and was held from 18 July until 24 July 2005. Second-seeded Fernando González won his second event of the year, and the sixth title of his professional career.

Finals

Singles

 Fernando González defeated  Agustín Calleri 7–5, 6–3

Doubles

 Martín García /  Luis Horna defeated  Fernando González /  Nicolás Massú 6–4, 6–4

References

External links
 ITF tournament edition details
 Singles draw
 Doubles draw

Dutch Open (tennis)
Dutch Open
Dutch Open (tennis)
Dutch Open (tennis), 2005